Tomas Baranauskas (born 12 September 1973 in Kaunas) is a Lithuanian historian specializing in the history of medieval Lithuania. He is the author of the book The Formation of the Lithuanian State.

Baranauskas spent his youth in Žeimelis and Anykščiai. In 1998, he graduated from the Faculty of History at the Vilnius University. Since September 1996 he works in the Lithuanian Institute of History.

At the end of May 2000, he published The Formation of the Lithuanian State ("Lietuvos valstybės ištakos"). In the book Baranauskas argued that the Grand Duchy of Lithuania formed earlier than generally accepted; i.e. that the state was founded before King Mindaugas. The book received mixed reviews from the academics.

Since 22 June 2000 Baranauskas maintains the largest site on the medieval history of Lithuania on the Internet – "Medieval Lithuania". Since March 2003 he also administers the official website of the Lithuanian Institute of History.

Baranauskas was the person who coined the term "Litvinism" for the theory and idea existing in Belarus according to which the Grand Duchy of Lithuania and medieval Lithuanians were Belarusian.

Books 
 Lietuvos valstybės ištakos, Vilnius, 2000, 317 p. . - Summary: The Formation of the Lithuanian State
 Vorutos pilis, Vilnius, 2001, 16 p. (together with Gintautas Zabiela) .
 Lietuvos istorijos kalendorius. 2002, Vilnius, 2001. .
 Lietuvos istorijos bibliografija. 1998, Vilnius, 2005, 333 p. .
 Anykščių medinė pilis, Anykščiai, 2005, 16 p.

References

External links 
Information about T: Baranauskas at Lithuanian University of Educational Sciences
Medieval Lithuania Medieval history of Lithuania

1973 births
Living people
Writers from Kaunas
Historians of Lithuania
21st-century Lithuanian historians
Vilnius University alumni